The 2018 Dalian Yifang F.C. season was the ninth season in club history.

Overview 
Dalian Yifang experienced a roller-coaster season, starting with a rather confusing status, then constantly improved their performances throughout the season, but faced difficulties again as multiple players are called up by the National training team, and finally made a great salvation.

Confusing Preseason
Yifang remained low profile after the last successful season, but the team decided not to renew the contract with Juan Caro, despite that Caro himself eagerly wanted to stay. On 26 December 2017, Dalian Yifang officially announced Ma Lin, who shortly sided with the team in 2014, to be the new manager, "under the decision of Dalian Municipal Bureau of Sports", indicating that the ownership of the team was actually in hiatus.

Dalian Yifang moved to Foshan, Guangdong and trained there from 3 January to 12 February, then flew to Jeju, South Korea after the Chinese New Year for further training.

Wanda Group, former owner of the disbanded famous local team Dalian Wanda F.C., was widely reported to take over Dalian Yifang, though the decision was not officially announced. The company sought to emphasize back on Chinese market by selling their major overseas assets including shares in Atlético Madrid, after Chinese government put strict regulations and bans on using domestic funding to invest foreign enterprises and investigated a few companies including Wanda, Hainan airlines and Anbang Group.

Yifang released Ferrari and Boli, while the two-time best scorer Nyasha Mushekwi stayed. Yifang signed Mate Maleš from HNK Rijeka before Wanda took control, but later claimed that he was medically unfit as soon as Wanda brought Fonté, Carrasco and Gaitán in, thus terminated the transfer and excluded him from the squad, because the 2018 CSL allowed up to 4 foreign players to be registered in one team only.

March
Yifang started the season with a catastrophic 0-8 defeat against Shanghai SIPG in the coming back match. The tactics, performance and substitutions were all chaotic. The manager Ma Lin even used six defenders after conceding 5 goals, but still too weak for SIPG's oppressing tactics. Ma Lin himself had already experienced a similar 8-1 defeat in the previous season with Liaoning FC against Shanghai Shenhua.

In the following two matches, Ma Lin used conservative 5-defender formation, putting Carrasco in the central forward position and fed him with long passes, but the results were unsatisfactory, as the team was still totally suppressed by the opponents. Nicolas Gaitán suffered a minor concussion during the match against Beijing Guoan.

The team made contact with Bernd Schuster to replace Ma Lin during the short break of the FIFA Calendar in late March.

April
On 3 April, Yifang announced that Zhou Jun, who had been working for Shanghai Shenhua since 2006, will be appointed as the chairman after his resignation at Shenhua.

Schuster focused on ball possession and passing. He used more young players than the U-23 policy required, which was seldom seen in other teams.

Yifang won the first match this season against Liaoning FC in the FA Cup. The team claimed that they will focus on the FA Cup, despite the fact that Yifang constantly struggled in the relegation area.

May

Yifang defeated Chongqing Dangdai by Sun Bo's long drive to enter the FA Cup quarter-finals on 2 May.

On 5 May, Yifang surprisingly overpowered the seven-time league champion Guangzhou Evergrande by 3-0, which was also the first league victory back in the Super League. Nyasha Mushekwi proved himself during this match, scoring 2 goals and gained a penalty as the starting striker. With the limitation of 3 foreign players in the line-up, he replaced José Fonte.

On 20 May, Yifang won the critical relegation match against Guizhou Hengfeng. Since Schuster's arrival, the team remain undefeated at home stadium.

On 27 May, Jia Xiuquan was appointed as the club's youth training chief inspector.

Summer Break
The 2018 Chinese Super League came to pause longer than usual, from the end of May until July, in consider of the 2018 FIFA World Cup. José Fonte and Yannick Carrasco entered the final squad to play for their respective national teams. Schuster claimed to improve the team during this period, while the club would seek for new players, especially defensive ones, to improve the squad.

Yifang U-19 youth team entered the final round of the U-19 FA Cup, but was defeated 3-4 (0-0) by Jiangsu Suning U-19 in penalty shootout on 28 June.

The team moved to Madrid, Spain for summer training from 8 June until 29 June. Leung Nok Hang, Duvier Riascos and a few young players had trials with the team. Mate Maleš left to join CFR Cluj. Wang Wanpeng signed loan contract to another local team Dalian Transcendence. On 21 June, Yifang signed Duvier Riascos for one and a half years on a free transfer, as well as Qin Sheng on a half-year loan from Shanghai Shenhua, then extended the contract with Nyasha Mushekwi for two years. Upon their return to China, Yifang signed Jin Pengxiang from Beijing Guoan on a half year loan. Fonte would terminate the contract with the club, as Riascos will take his position as foreign player.

July
Yifang started the second half of the season with 5-0 aggregate victory against China League Two team Sichuan Jiuniu in the FA cup, to enter the semi-finals. Cui Ming'an scored a volley from outside the box in the second leg.

However, the team did not gained victory in the league since their return as multiple players could not attend the match. Wang Yaopeng, Zhu Ting, Li Shuai and Zhou Ting all had muscle issues, while Carrasco did not return until 31 July.

August 
Yifang lost 3 games in a row until the August 1 match against Changchun Yatai. Yang Shanping received a red card as soon as the game started. Li Shuai was called up for China U23 squad to prepare for the 2018 Asian Games, and Yifang gained advantage of using 1 less U23 player than required until 10 August. The losing streak was terminated by a successful 1-0 home revenge to Shanghai SIPG on 5 August. Carrasco scored the only goal after returning from the World Cup. Zhu Xiaogang received a severe 6-match suspension for giving the finger to Shanghai SIPG players after the match. Shortly after, Nyasha Mushekwi scored the first and only hat trick in squad this season, to beat Guangzhou R&F by 3-0, but would miss the next match for accumulating 4 yellow cards. This victory brought Yifang out of the relegation area for the first time this season. Yifang defeated relegation opponent Henan Jianye by 2-1. Although Zhang Chong made a crucial mistake to give Ricardo Vaz Te a gift goal, Mushekwi scored twice to bring the team back to life. Much controversy appeared as Schuster used regular startups in the FA cup match against Shandong Luneng, that the team's performance would be limited by frequent fixtures. Yifang obtained a 1-1 away draw from another relegation opponent, Chongqing Dangdai, on 25 August.

Noticeably, on 12 August, FIFA ordered Iraqi club Al-Shorta SC to pay a final $805,000-worth compensation to Yifang. Al-Shorta signed Nashat Akram in 2014 from Dalian Aerbin, but Akram left Aerbin without permission, and FIFA's decided the transfer had violated the rules. FIFA informed the club previously in March, but the club failed to pay the requested $790 thousand at the time.

September
Yifang scored 4 goals for the first time this season to claim the 4-3 victory against Shandong Luneng. Jin Qiang scored for the first time since the match against Hunan Billows on 25 July 2015. Zhou Ting broke the record of the oldest player to score in the Chinese Super League by the age of 39 years and 208 days, which he had broken before by the age 36 years and 94 days during the 2015 season for Beijing Guoan against Changchun Yatai on 10 May 2015. Carrasco would play for Belgium in the  UEFA Nations League. Mushekwi returned to Zimbabwe, but would miss the 2019 AFCON qualification, because he had had a lot of pain in the pelvis area, and would go for a planned examination in South Africa.

The September 15 match against Tianjin Quanjian would be played one day in advance, in consider that Quanjian's AFC championship home match against J1 League team Kashima Antlers on 18 September was moved to Macau due to multiple concerns. With Li Shuai's first goal in his professional career, Yifang won the first away 3-point from Quanjian.

Yifang continued the winning streak after defeating Shanghai Shenhua by 2-1. Mushekwi scored twice, including a volley near the goal area. He and Carrasco however, were not chosen for the FA cup away match in Shandong on 25 September, as Yifang headed for exit in the FA cup semi-finals by conceding 3 goals, and was unable to break the 2013 record, when Aerbin lost both matches against Guizhou Moutai in the semi-finals. Although Yifang lost the away match in Guangdong, their points had reached a safer position through September.

October
Chinese Football Association called up a training squad consists of 55 players, from 8 October until 31 December, including Li Shuai, Wang Yaopeng and Wang Jinxian, after released a file previously on 30 September, indicating that Yifang was capable to neglect the U-23 policy from October. These 3 players would miss the rest league matches this season.

Yifang claimed another home victory against Suning. Mushekwi scored twice again, in addition to a free-kick goal from Carrasco, who would miss the next match for accumulating 4 yellow cards.

As for the 20 October lost in Guizhou, Zhang Chong achieved, as the team officially recorded, his 100th appearance under the team name of Dalian Yifang, since Yifang took actual control of Dalian Aerbin F.C. in July 2015. Qin Sheng strained his muscle in the match, bringing further difficulties to the team's defense line.

Yifang lost 2-3 to Hebei CFFC, with Riascos and Cui Ming'an both scored from outside the box. Mushekwi was unable to play as the doctor recommended, and would have a surgery in Madrid to treat the problem that stalked him for the entire season some time later.

On 26 October, a football forum was held in Bangchui Island Hotel, Dalian. Wang Jianlin, potential owner of Yifang, attended the forum, together with the city mayor, a few CFA officials, and owners of other football clubs in Dalian, to discuss about future development of local football. This was strongly believed to be a sign, that Wanda would officially take over the team in the 2019 season, as they did some 24 years ago.

November
Yifang's November started with another critical loss. Zhu Ting scored his first goal in 2018 season, but Zhang Chong made a Karius-like mistake, by throwing the ball directly to Cao Yongjing, thus ruined the match. Moreover, Yifang lost the following desperate match to Tianjin TEDA. The 4-match losing streak pushed Yifang to the brink of relegation. Mushekwi scored his 50th goal at Yifang, but had a heavy collision later with TEDA goalkeeper Yang Qipeng. He bravely volunteered to resume playing after a short faint, but was eventually substituted off. Later inspection indicated that he suffered potential cervical vertebra injury, to miss the next match.

The last round of 2018 season on 11 November saw a desperate situation, as Yifang, Tianjin TEDA, Changchun Yatai and Chongqing Dangdai were identical 32 points. Any loss or draw would lead to large relegation possibilities, Yifang have to win the game to ensure safety. Yatai striker Odion Ighalo was unable to play due to injuries, while Qin Sheng returned in time. With Riascos's header and Carrasco's killer shot near the goal line, the season-highest 51,666 fans watched Yifang safely ranked 11th as the 2018 Chinese Super League reached its final moments.

Squad

First team Squad

Reserve squad 
As of 1 March 2018

Out on loan

Coaching staff 
As of August 2018.

Transfers

Winter

In

Out

Summer

In

Out

Kits 

 Shirt sponsor: Front: 万达城 (Wanda City), Back: 万达广场(Wanda Plaza) (until 18 August)/百年人寿(Aeon Life) (from 18 August)
 Shirt manufacturer: Nike

Friendlies

Preseason

Summer

Chinese Super League

League table

Results summary

Position by round

League fixtures and results 
Fixtures as of 13 February 2018. Might be adjusted if necessary.

Chinese FA Cup

FA Cup fixtures and results

Quarter-finals

Semi-finals

Squad statistics

Appearances and goals 
As of November 2018. Source

Goalscorers

Disciplinary record

Suspensions

References 

Dalian Professional F.C. seasons
Dalian Yifang F.C.